The Ligue Féminine de Basketball (LFB; Women's Basketball League) is the top women's French professional basketball league.

Champions

* precedes the score of the team playing at home.

Clubs

Current season (2021–22)
 Union Féminine Angers Basket 49 (Angers)
 Tango Bourges Basket (Bourges)
 Flammes Carolo Basket Ardennes (Charleville-Mézières)
 Charnay Basket Bourgogne Sud (Charnay-lès-Mâcon)
 Landerneau Bretagne Basket (Landerneau)
 Basket Landes (Mont-de-Marsan)
 Basket Lattes Montpellier Agglomération (Lattes)
 ASVEL Féminin (Lyon)
 Roche Vendée Basket Club (La Roche-sur-Yon)
 Saint-Amand Hainaut Basket (Saint-Amand-les-Eaux)
 Tarbes Gespe Bigorre (Tarbes)
 ESB de Villeneuve d'Ascq – Lille Métropole (Villeneuve-d'Ascq)

Season 2012–2013
 Pays d'Aix Basket 13 (Aix-en-Provence)
 ASPTT Arras (Arras)
 CJM Bourges Basket (Bourges)
 Challes-les-Eaux Basket (Challes-les-Eaux)
 Flammes Carolo basket (Charleville-Mézières)
 Basket Landes (Mont-de-Marsan)
 Basket Lattes Montpellier Agglomération (Lattes)
 USO Mondeville (Mondeville)
 Rezé-Nantes Basket 44 (Nantes)
 Basket Catalan Perpignan Méditerranée (Perpignan)
 Hainaut Saint-Amand (Saint-Amand-les-Eaux)
 Tarbes Gespe Bigorre (Tarbes)
 Toulouse Métropole Basket (Toulouse)
 ESB Villeneuve-d'Ascq (Villeneuve-d'Ascq)

Former LFB clubs 
 US Valenciennes Olympic
 RC Strasbourg (1998–2000, 2004–2006),
 Toulouse-Launaguet Basket (1998–1999, 2002–2004),
 Limoges ABC (1999–2000)
 Évolution Roubaix (2003–2004)
 W Bordeaux Basket (1997–2003)
 Saint-Jacques Sports Reims
 ASA Sceaux Basket Féminin
 Istres Sports BC (2000–2001)
 Avenir de Rennes (1998–1999)
 Rezé-Nantes Basket 44
 USO Mondeville

Broadcaster
The Ligue Féminine de Basketball is currently broadcast on the YouTube channel of the FFBB. The playoffs of the 2021–22 season were also broadcast on the TV channel Sport en France .

External links
 Official website

Feminine
France
Sports leagues established in 1998
League
1998 establishments in France
Professional sports leagues in France